Stena may refer to:

 Ştena, a commune in Romania
 Stena (Macedonia), a station in ancient Macedonia
 Stena Sphere, Swedish conglomerate
 Stena Line, a ferry operator

See also 
 Kteni, a village in the region of Macedonia, Greece; whose name in Macedonian is Стени (transliteration, "Steni")